Kurt Stanley Haupt (born 17 January 1989) is a South African-born German professional rugby union player, who most recently played with Worcester Warriors. His regular position is hooker.

Rugby career

2007–2012: Youth and Varsity Cup rugby

Haupt was born in Johannesburg, but attended St. Alban's College in nearby Pretoria. He was selected to represent the Pretoria-based  on one occasions during his high school career – at the Under-18 Academy Week in 2007.

After school, Haupt enrolled and played rugby for the University of Pretoria. He was included in their Varsity Cup squads from 2009 to 2012, but only made nine appearances during that time, of which only three were starts. He was also named in the  squad in 2010, but to make any appearances for them.

2013: Blue Bulls

He also came on as a replacement against the  a fortnight later in his only other senior appearance for the Blue Bulls.

2014–2017: SWD Eagles

In May 2014, the George-based  signed Haupt following a recommendation from national team coach Heyneke Meyer. He went straight into their first team for their 2014 Currie Cup qualification campaign, featuring in all six of their matches.

Haupt appeared in the Vodacom Cup for the SWD Eagles for the first time in 2015, making three starts in the competition. A poor showing in the 2015 Currie Cup qualification series saw the SWD Eagles finish bottom of the log, with Haupt featuring in four of their six matches, of which they managed to win just one.

References

South African rugby union players
Living people
1989 births
Rugby union players from Johannesburg
Rugby union hookers
Blue Bulls players
SWD Eagles players
Southern Kings players
Germany international rugby union players
South African people of German descent